Whedon is a surname. Notable people with the surname include:

 Frances L. Whedon, American meteorologist
Jed Whedon, a screenwriter and musician, son of Tom Whedon and brother of Joss Whedon
John Whedon, a writer for television, Tom Whedon's father and Joss Whedon's grandfather
Joss Whedon, a writer, director, and executive producer for television
 Tom Whedon, a writer for television, Joss Whedon's father
 Zack Whedon, a writer for television, son of Tom Whedon and brother of Joss Whedon

Fictional characters:
 Evangeline Whedon, a fictional character in the Marvel Comics Universe
 Joe Whedon, a fictional character on the primetime show Brothers & Sisters
 Sarah Whedon, a fictional character on the primetime show Brothers & Sisters